Hermansverk is the administrative centre of Sogndal Municipality in Vestland county, Norway. The village serves as the seat of the County Governor of Vestland county.

Prior to 2020, the village served as the administrative centre of both the municipality of Leikanger and also Sogn og Fjordane county (although the county capital is usually referred to as Leikanger, not Hermansverk).

Norwegian National Road 55 connects both areas. The main church for the municipality, Leikanger Church, was located in Leikanger, and the municipal and county administration was located in Hermansverk. Over the years, the two villages grew together, and they are now effectively one large village, and the government considers them one urban settlement. The government refers to the village as "Hermansverk/Leikanger". The names can also be used interchangeably. The urban area is also now known as Systrond.

References

Sogndal
Villages in Vestland